The women's 3000 metres at the 1978 European Athletics Championships was held in Prague, then Czechoslovakia, at Stadion Evžena Rošického on 29 August 1978.

Medalists

Results

Final
29 August

Participation
According to an unofficial count, 26 athletes from 14 countries participated in the event.

 (2)
 (3)
 (2)
 (1)
 (1)
 (2)
 (2)
 (2)
 (2)
 (3)
 (1)
 (1)
 (3)
 (1)

References

3000 metres
3000 metres at the European Athletics Championships
1978 in women's athletics